Domrud-e Olya (also Romanized as Domrūd-e ‘Olyā; also known as Changā’ī, Chingani, Chin Kanī, and Dom Rūd) is a village in Mamulan Rural District, Mamulan District, Pol-e Dokhtar County, Lorestan Province, Iran. At the 2006 census, its population was 527, in 120 families.

References 

Towns and villages in Pol-e Dokhtar County